Fulham Football Club is an English professional football team based in Fulham in the London Borough of Hammersmith and Fulham. The club was formed in West Kensington in 1879 as Fulham St Andrew's Church Sunday School F.C., shortened to Fulham F.C. in 1888. They initially played at Fulham Fields before a move to Craven Cottage in 1896; the club played their first professional match in December 1898 and made their FA Cup debut in the 1902–03 season. The club competed in the Southern Football League between 1898 and 1907, when they were accepted into the Football League Second Division. Having spent much of their history outside the top division, the team gained promotion to the Premier League in 2001. They spent more than ten seasons in the top flight, and reached the final of the UEFA Europa League in 2010. In 2014 they were relegated to the Championship. They have since spent one further season back in the Premier League in 2018–19 but suffered an immediate return to the Championship.

Since the club's first competitive match, 966 players have made an appearance in a competitive match, of which 500 have played only a handful of matches (including substitute appearances); all players who have made fewer than 25 appearances for the club are listed below. Harry Arter, Ivan Cavaleiro, Ibrahima Cissé, Luca de la Torre, Marcelo Djaló, Tayo Edun, Fabri, Tyrese Francois, Anthony Knockaert, Alfie Mawson, Josh Onomah, Matt O'Riley, Harrison Reed, Bobby Decordova-Reid, Steven Sessegnon and Martell Taylor-Crossdale are the current squad members who have played less than 25 matches for Fulham.

Arter, Cavaleiro, Francois, Knockaert, Onomah, Reed, Decordova-Reid and Taylor-Crossdale have all made their Fulham debut during the 2019–20 season, with Francois, Onomah and Taylor-Crossdale all making their first appearance most recently in Fulham's League Cup tie against Southampton F.C. on 27 August 2019.

Players
This list contains the 500 players, including sixteen current squad members, as of 30 August 2019, who have made fewer than 25 appearances for Fulham, ordered by the year in which they played for the club and then alphabetically by surname. The figure for league appearances and goals comprise those in the Southern Football League, the Football League and the Premier League. Total appearances and goals comprise those in the Southern Football League, Football League (including test matches and play-offs), Premier League, FA Cup, Football League Cup, Football League Trophy, UEFA Intertoto Cup and UEFA Cup/Europa League. Wartime matches are regarded as unofficial and are excluded, as are matches from the abandoned 1939–40 season. Statistics for the Watney Cup and Anglo-Scottish Cup are not included in the table. International appearances and goals are given for the senior national team only.

Figures are mostly taken from Fulham: The Complete Record by Dennis Turner (published in 2007). UEFA Intertoto Cup and UEFA Cup/Europa League appearance statistics for 2002–03, 2009–10 and 2011–12 are taken from Soccerbase, along with all other statistics from the 2007–08 season onwards.

Statistics are correct as of 30 August 2019. International statistics are correct as of 19 July 2019.

Notes

References
General
 
 
 Fulham at Soccerbase.
 .
 

Specific

External links
 Fulham F.C. official website

Players 1-25
Players 1-25
 1-25
Fulham 1-25
Association football player non-biographical articles